Ronnie Perkins (born September 29, 1999) is an American football linebacker for the New England Patriots of the National Football League (NFL). He played college football at Oklahoma.

Early years
Perkins attended Lutheran High School North in St. Louis, Missouri. As a senior in 2017, he was named the St. Louis Post-Dispatch All-Metro football defensive player of the year. He played in the 2018 U.S. Army All-American Bowl. Perkins committed to the University of Oklahoma to play college football.

College career
As a true freshman at Oklahoma in 2018, Perkins started seven games and recorded 37 tackles and five sacks. He started all 13 games he played in his sophomore year before being suspended for the 2019 Peach Bowl due to a failed drug test. He finished the season with 38 tackles and six sacks. The suspension continued five games into his junior year in 2020.

Professional career

Perkins was drafted by the New England Patriots in the third round, 96th overall, of the 2021 NFL Draft. On July 20, 2021, Perkins signed his four-year rookie contract with New England. After being inactive the first 13 games of the season, he was placed on injured reserve on December 17 without being active for a game as a rookie.

On August 23, 2022, Perkins was placed on injured reserve with still having to be active for an NFL game.

References

External links
Oklahoma Sooners bio

Living people
Players of American football from St. Louis
American football defensive ends
Oklahoma Sooners football players
1999 births
New England Patriots players